The Alexandria–Pentagon Line, designated as Routes 10A, 10E & 10N, is a daily bus route operated by the Washington Metropolitan Area Transit Authority between Huntington station of the Yellow Line of the Washington Metro (10A), Hunting Point (10E), or Ronald Reagan Washington National Airport station of the Yellow and Blue lines of the Washington Metro and Pentagon station of the Yellow and Blue lines of the Washington Metro. This line provides service within the neighborhoods in Fairfax County, Alexandria, and Arlington County. Alongside the neighborhoods, it also brings service through the marketplace, businesses, and offices within the counties.

Route description and service

The 10A, 10E, and 10N operate from Four Mile Run Division on various schedules. The 10A operates daily service, the 10E only operates during weekday peak hours, and the 10N only operates during late Friday and Saturday nights and early Sunday mornings. The 10A and 10E follow the same path, although in different terminals. The 10A operates from Huntington station through Pentagon station via Mount Vernon Avenue, Washington Street and Pentagon Row, while the 10E operates from Hunting Point, through Pentagon station via Army Navy Drive. The 10E operates on a one way route, mornings to Pentagon Station and afternoons to Hunting Point. The 10N is the shortest route of the line, running from Ronald Reagan Washington National Airport station to Pentagon station through Crystal City and Pentagon City.

History

The Alexandria–Pentagon Line was introduced in 1960, under the Mount Vernon Avenue Line, as the route was part of the Alexandria, Barcroft and Washington Transit Company. It is the only route that the line is co-operated with the Washington Virginia & Maryland Coach Company. It was later operated by WMATA in 1973, when it acquired all routes from the AB&W and the WV&M. Since 1973, the Alexandria–Pentagon Line consists of all 10 line. The 10 line provides reliable service within Fairfax County, the City of Alexandria, and Arlington County to connect from neighborhoods, to marketplaces, to landmarks, and to business. Although, the Alexandria–Pentagon Line has various names and routes prior to the current name throughout the years.

Original Alexandria–Pentagon Line

The original Alexandria–Pentagon Line consists of 7 routes, as three lines was merged following the formation of WMATA and the creation of Metrobus. The original line consists of routes 12A, 12E, 14A, 14B, 15A, 15B and 15D, under the Alexandria–Washington Line. The 12A and 12E was originally the Braddock Heights Line, while the 14A and 14B was originally the Arlington Ridge Road Line, and 15A, 15B, and 15D was originally the Russell Road Line, all operated by the AB&W before the 7 routes was merged in 1973. The line was later renamed to the Alexandria–Pentagon Line in 1983, until all routes was discontinued on March 11, 1984. The 12A and 12E would later be brought back in service under the Centreville South Line, while the 14A and 14B would also be brought back to operate under the Montgomery–Tysons Beltway Express.

Alexandria–Arlington–Pentagon Line

The 10 line started its service as part of the Alexandria–Arlington–Pentagon Line. The 10 line consists of routes 10B, 10E, 10S, and 10T. The 10 line was also one of the new start of service through the City of Alexandria, following the introduction of route 10A, and the introduction of Alexandria Transit Company's DASH in March 1984, despite the elimination of the 10S and 10T. The line was later split through the late 1980s to early 1990s, when the entire 10 line was rerouted to serve to different stations of the Washington Metro system map.

Hunting Towers–Pentagon Line

Following the split of the 10 line, the 10A and 10E was renamed to the Hunting Towers–Pentagon Line from the late 1980s to early 1990s, while the 10B was split to form the  Hunting Towers–Ballston Line. From the split, the 10A operated from Hunting Towers to Pentagon station, with select late night trips operating up to Old Town Alexandria near Braddock Road Station. The 10E once operated between the neighborhood of Del Ray in Alexandria and Pentagon station during directional peak hours.

Hunting Point–Pentagon Line

On September 30, 2012, the line is renamed to Hunting Point–Pentagon Line, as Hunting Point being the new name for the southern terminus of the 10A. Following the name change, the line started to expand its service, having the 10E extending to Rosslyn station. In 2014, the 10R and 10S was introduced on the line to bring in more service to the line. The 10R and 10S replaced the northern segment of the 10E, bringing the 10E route back where it originally was. The 10S was brought back in service as it was last used in 1984. Both the 10R and 10S operates during peak directional route, along with the 10E. The 10S is the only route which operates alongside Jefferson Davis Highway (now Richmond Highway) as the other routes continues to operate via Mount Vernon Avenue. The line was later renamed to Alexandria–Pentagon Line on June 26, 2016, following bus simplification of the line. It was the first time since 1984, which the Alexandria–Pentagon Line last operated under various routes.

March 1984 Changes

On March 11, 1984, the 10S and 10T was discontinued and was replaced by route 10A. Alternate service is available by the 10B, 10E, and Alexandria Transit Company's DASH routes.

June 2008 Changes

On June 29, 2008, the 10E was extended from Del Ray to Braddock Road station. The 10E will continue to serve Del Ray via Mount Vernon Avenue along with the 10A.

September 2012 Changes

On September 30, 2012, the 10E was extended to serve Rosslyn station. The 10E extension brings in service in Crystal City via Crystal City VRE station, however, it will not serve the Crystal City Metro station.

2013 Proposed Changes

In 2013, WMATA proposed two options to the 10A and the 10E, following a major change planned for the route.

The first option was to truncate the 10E to Pentagon station, with the 10A being extended to Rosslyn station. The 10A would be renamed as the 10R, and will no longer operate via Pentagon station and will continue towards Rosslyn via Jefferson Davis Highway (now Richmond Highway).

The second option was similar like the first option, however, the 10A was proposed to extend its peak period trips to Downtown in Washington D.C. via Rosslyn station. The peak-hour 10A would be renamed as the 10Y, and will operate on the same path as the first option, although with the extension, the 10Y will continue towards Interstate 66 to terminate at Farragut Square. There would be no changes for the off-peak and weekend 10A trips, retaining the same route number for these trips.

The reason why WMATA planned these changes, was to provide better connections from Hunting Point and downtown Alexandria to Rosslyn and Washington D.C., and to improve service time to Rosslyn to make the 10A reliable. It was also to reduce crowding to the Blue and Orange Lines of the Washington Metro during peak-hours.

March 2014 Changes

On March 30, 2014, the 10R and 10S was introduced, with the 10S replacing the 9E. The 10R and 10S also replaced the 10E Rosslyn extension. Both the 10R and 10S runs during peak directional route, along with the 10E. Although, the 10S does not serve Crystal City, leading a non-stop service between Pentagon station and Rosslyn station.

June 2016 Changes

On June 26, 2016, major changes occurred to the 10 line. The 10A was rerouted to serve between Old Town Alexandria and Huntington Station, replacing route 9A. The 10R and 10S was discontinued as the 10R was a redundancy of the 10E and the 10S was a redundancy of Metroway, by operating on the same path and times, despite that the 10S skips Crystal City. These changes result of the reincarination of the Rosslyn extension to the 10E.

June 2017 Changes

On June 25, 2017, route 10N was introduced to operate between Ronald Reagan Washington National Airport and Pentagon station via Crystal City and Pentagon city. The new 10N replaced the 13Y from the Arlington–Union Station Line, as it operates the same intervals as the 13Y, however, the 10N will only operate during Friday and Saturday late nights (after midnight) and early morning Sunday service between 6:30 AM and 7:30 AM only, and will not operate to Washington D.C. The 10N was also added as the Washington Metro service hours was changed.

June 2018 Changes

On June 24, 2018, the 10E segment between Rosslyn and the Pentagon was eliminated, as it was a redundancy of the Blue Line. The 10E will continue to operate between Pentagon station and Hunting Point during peak hours.

2019 Platform Improvement Project

On May 25, 2019, major changes was added on the 10A, as WMATA announced the summer shutdown on the Yellow and Blue lines of the Washington Metro, to rebuild station platforms on 6 stations south of Ronald Reagan Washington National Airport station. The 10A increased service on peak hours from 30 minutes and 15 minutes, and will serve both sides of the Huntington station. These changes went in effect from Memorial Day until Labor Day, the time when the 6 Yellow/Blue line stations was rebuilt.

September 2020 proposed changes 
On September 10, 2020, as part of its FY2022 proposed budget, WMATA proposed to eliminate routes 10E and 10N service in order to reduce costs and low federal funds. Route 10E has not operated since March 13, 2020 while route 10N has not operated since August 21, 2020 due to Metro's response to the COVID-19 pandemic.

References

10A